A. B. M. Ashraf Uddin is a Bangladesh Nationalist Party politician and the former Member of Parliament of Lakshmipur-4.

Career
Uddin was elected to parliament from Lakshmipur-4 as a Bangladesh Nationalist Party candidate in 2001 and 2008. He chaired the parliamentary standing committee on fisheries and livestock ministry.

References

Bangladesh Nationalist Party politicians
Living people
8th Jatiya Sangsad members
9th Jatiya Sangsad members
Year of birth missing (living people)